Shae D'lyn (born Shae D'lyn Sherertz; November 24, 1963, Abilene, Texas) is an American actress. She is best known for her roles as series regular Jane Deaux/Cavanaugh on the sitcom Dharma & Greg, as Cousin Vicki in the feature film Vegas Vacation, and a recurring role as Carolyn Rothstein on Boardwalk Empire.

Life and career
After graduating with honors from the University of Virginia, D'Lyn worked as an investment analyst for Morrow & Co. on Wall Street. After a year in New York, she moved to Boston as vice president of real estate investment banking for Boston Capital Partners where she syndicated low-income housing to investors seeking tax credits. Bored with financial services, she applied for, and was accepted to acting school.

Upon graduation, D'lyn immediately made appearances on television and in film. Her first appearance was in a 1993 episode of Quantum Leap, soon followed by the 1993 TNT television film of Arthur Miller's The American Clock. Her television work, aside from Dharma & Greg (1997–2001), included guest-starring appearances in Ellen, Law & Order and the role of Carolyn Rothstein on Boardwalk Empire in 2014. She starred in the off-Broadway premiere of Tennessee Williams' Baby Doll.

D'lyn directs theater, film, and television productions, and has founded a production company based in Los Angeles and Puerto Rico and an artists' cooperative in Los Angeles, New York, Vancouver, and Toronto with over 400 members. D'lyn produced and directed two documentary shorts released in 2006, of which Morir Para Ser Libre was featured at that year's Boston Latino Film Festival.

As of 2009, D'lyn had created the HearME project, which put interconnected music studios in orphanages worldwide; as of 2022 the website for HearME no longer exists.

Selected filmography

Television Roles

References

External links
 
 

1963 births
Actresses from Texas
American film actresses
American television actresses
Circle in the Square Theatre School alumni
Living people
People from Abilene, Texas
University of Virginia alumni
20th-century American actresses
21st-century American women